is a Japanese manufacturer of electronic components, based in Nagaokakyo, Kyoto.

Honorary Chairman Akira Murata started Murata Manufacturing as a personal venture in October, 1944. In December 1950 reorganized the company into Murata Manufacturing Co., Ltd. with paid-in Capital ¥1 million.

Murata Manufacturing is primarily involved in the manufacturing of ceramic passive electronic components, primarily capacitors, and has an overwhelming marketshare worldwide in ceramic filters, high-frequency parts, and sensors.

As of March 31, 2013 Murata Manufacturing has 24 subsidiaries in Japan and 52 overseas in the United States, Canada, Mexico, Brazil, Germany, France, Italy, the United Kingdom, Switzerland, the Netherlands, Spain, Hungary, Finland, China, Taiwan, South Korea, Singapore, Malaysia, the Philippines, Thailand, Hong Kong, Vietnam and India.

On April 13, 2012, Murata announced a deal to acquire RF Monolithics for $1.78 per share.

On August 23, 2014, Murata announced the acquisition of Peregrine Semiconductor Corporation.

On July 28, 2016, a memorandum of understanding was signed between Murata and Sony announcing the intent to sell a portion of the latter's battery business (Sony Energy Devices Corporation).

In October 2017, Murata announced sponsorship of an exhibit in the Epcot theme park at Florida's Walt Disney World. Entitled The SpectacuLAB, the science oriented presentation emphasizes STEM themes in support of children's education. Murata also bought Sony's battery business.

On December 15, 2020, Murata announced the opening of a new research and development center dedicated to automotive applications in Minatomirai, Yokohama, Kanagawa Prefecture.

On March 28, 2022, Murata announced the acquisition of Resonant Inc for $4.50 a share.

Products
Murata has a variety of electronic products ranging from communication and wireless modules to power supplies. The company is also famous for manufacturing lumped components and RF filters based on different processing technologies like thin-film, thick-film, and LTCC (Low Temperature Co-fired Ceramics). This includes monolithic ceramic capacitors, multilayer ceramic devices, chip inductors, SAW filters, crystal filters, LC filters, ceramic resonators, and others.
Murata conducts research on new technology related to RF components, which has led it to acquire many patents. Murata holds several patents and patent applications for technology related to ceramic capacitors.

In December 2021, Murata co-developed with Michelin a RFID module that is embedded into the tire that will keep track of inventory, allow for aftermarket maintenance, and assist with the recycling of the tire at the end of the product life cycle. The tags require no external power supply and will operate over high mileages.

Gallery

See also

 Murata Machinery, an industrial machines manufacturer that is often confused with Murata Manufacturing

References

External links

Murata Manufacturing Co., Ltd.

Electronics companies of Japan
Defense companies of Japan
Robotics companies of Japan
Robotics in Japan
Companies listed on the Tokyo Stock Exchange
Companies listed on the Osaka Exchange
Companies listed on the Singapore Exchange
Companies based in Kyoto Prefecture
Ceramics manufacturers of Japan
Electronics companies established in 1944
Japanese brands
1944 establishments in Japan
Capacitor manufacturers
Power supply manufacturers